Red Nail Polish (romanized: Lake Ghermez) is a 2016 Iranian film directed by Seyyed Jamal Seyyed Hatami. The film was selected to attend the New Look at the 34th Fajr Film Festival and was nominated for Best Director and Best Film in the New Look of the Festival. It was released on December 11, 2016 in Iran theatrically.

Premise 

Akram is a sixteen-year-old girl who must struggle with financial and social problems in her life when the world shows her its ugly face. Arsalan, Akram's father, is addicted to drugs and beats his wife; but he loves making wooden dolls. When Arsalan dies, the family faces many problems. Azam, Mother of the family, wants to send Akram to Arak, but she doesn't accept it.

Cast 
Pardis Ahmadieh as Akram
Pantea Panahiha as Azam
Behnam Tashakkor as Arsalan
Masoud Keramati as Uncle Vali

Release 
Red Nail Polish was released on February 1, 2016 to February 11 at some Tehran cinemas in the Fajr International Film Festival. It was released on December 11, 2016 in Iran theatrically.

Awards and nominations 
Best Supporting Actress (Pantea Panahiha) at the Iranian Cinema Celebration
Best Actress Award nominee (Pardis Ahmadieh) at the Iranian Cinema Celebration
Best Film nominee for New Look at the Fajr Film Festival

References

External links 
Lake Ghermez in IMDb

2016 films
Iranian drama films
2010s Persian-language films
2016 directorial debut films